Dominika Škorvánková (born 21 August 1991) is a Slovak football midfielder, currently playing for Montpellier in the French Division 1. She has also played for Slovan Bratislava in Slovakia's First League, SV Neulengbach in Austria's ÖFB-Frauenliga, SC Sand and Bayern Munich in the Bundesliga. In 2009, 2012, 2013, 2014, 2015, 2016, 2017, 2018 and 2019 she was named the best Slovak player of the year.

She is a member of the Slovak national team. On 10 April 2021, Škorvánková played her 100th match for Slovakia in a 0–0 draw with Mexico.

International goals

Honours

ŠK Slovan Bratislava
Slovak Women's First League: Champion 2008–09, 2009–10, 2010–11, 2011–12
Slovak Women's Cup: Champion 2009, 2011, 2012

SV Neulengbach
ÖFB-Frauenliga: Champion 2012–13, 2013–14

SC Sand
DFB-Pokal: Runner-up 2015–16, 2016–17

FC Bayern Munich
Bundesliga: Runner-up 2017–18, 2018–19, 2019–20

References

1991 births
Living people
Slovak women's footballers
Slovak expatriate sportspeople in Austria
Slovak expatriate footballers
SV Neulengbach (women) players
Expatriate women's footballers in Austria
Expatriate women's footballers in Germany
Slovak expatriate sportspeople in Germany
Slovakia women's international footballers
SC Sand players
FC Bayern Munich (women) players
People from Senec District
Sportspeople from the Bratislava Region
Frauen-Bundesliga players
Women's association football midfielders
Montpellier HSC (women) players
Expatriate women's footballers in France
Slovak expatriate sportspeople in France
ÖFB-Frauenliga players
ŠK Slovan Bratislava (women) players
FIFA Century Club